This is a list of all the awards given by the Association of Tennis Professionals (ATP) to players and others of particular distinction during a given season. Rafael Nadal is the only man to win every ATP award in the player category.

Player & Team of the Year

The ATP Player and Team of the Year awards are presently given to the player and team who end the year as world No. 1 in the ATP rankings. In earlier years, this was not explicitly the case as in 1975, 1976, 1977, 1978, 1982 and 1989 the Players of the Year named by the ATP (listed below) did not have the No. 1 ranking based on the ATP's point system at the end of that particular year.  In those years, the No. 1 ranking was held by Jimmy Connors (1975–78), John McEnroe (1982) and Ivan Lendl (1989). The most successful players in this category are Novak Djokovic in singles, and Bryan brothers in doubles.

Coach of the Year
The ATP Coach of the Year award goes to the ATP coach who helped guide his players to a higher level of performance during the year. It is nominated and voted by fellow ATP coaches.

Tim Gullikson Career Coach Award
The Tim Gullikson Career Coach award showcases someone who has inspired generations of young players and fellow coaches to grow the sport of tennis. It is voted on by fellow ATP coaches.

Most improved player, Comeback player & Newcomer of the year
Most Improved Player award - This award is voted by the ATP players from the nominees. It goes to the player who reached a significantly higher ATP ranking by year’s end and who demonstrated an increasingly improved level of performance through the year.
Newcomer of the Year award - This award is voted by the ATP players from the nominees. It goes to the Next Generation player (player aged 21-and-under) who entered the Top 100 for the first time and made the biggest impact on the ATP Tour during the season. From 2013 to 2017, this award was named ATP Star of Tomorrow, and it was given to the youngest player who ended the year in the Top 100 of the ATP Singles Rankings. If two or more players in the Top 100 shared the youngest birth year, the higher-ranked player won the award.
Comeback Player of the Year award - This award is voted by the ATP players from the nominees. It goes to the player who has overcome serious injury in re-establishing himself as one of the top players on the ATP Tour.

Fans' Favourite
The ATP Fans' Favourite award is voted online by tennis fans from the top 25 singles players and top 15 doubles teams in the year's Race Rankings as of the rankings update after the US Open is concluded.

Stefan Edberg Sportsmanship Award
The Stefan Edberg Sportsmanship award is unique as it is voted by the ATP players themselves from the ones nominated by the ATP. The award goes to the player who, throughout the year, conducted himself at the highest level of professionalism and integrity, who competed with his fellow players with the utmost spirit of fairness and who promoted the game through his off-court activities.

Arthur Ashe Humanitarian & Ron Bookman Media Excellence awards
The Arthur Ashe Humanitarian award - This award is presented by the ATP to a person, not necessarily an ATP Player, who has made outstanding humanitarian contributions.
The Ron Bookman Media Excellence award - This award is presented by the ATP to journalists who have made "significant contributions to the game of tennis".

Tournaments of the Year
The Tournament of the Year awards are voted by the ATP players for the different categories: ATP Tour Masters 1000, ATP Tour 500 and ATP Tour 250. The awards go to the tournament in its category that operated at the highest level of professionalism and integrity and which provided the best conditions and atmosphere for participating players.

See also
WTA Awards
ITF World Champions
World number 1 ranked male tennis players
World number 1 ranked female tennis players
Tennis statistics

References

 

Tennis awards
+
Tennis records and statistics